Ivan Ramesis Perez Mayrina (born December 23, 1976) is a Filipino broadcaster, journalist, reporter and news anchor. He is currently working in GMA Network.

Early life
Mayrina was hailed from Angeles City and is currently living in Quezon City, after graduating in UP Diliman, he focused on his family life.

He finished the secondary education at high school in Pampanga, his first tertiary education in Holy Angel University and graduated of broadcasting, and second tertiary education in University of the Philippines Diliman, with Bachelor of Arts in Communication Research at the College of Mass Communication and graduated in April 1997.

Prior to his work in GMA Network, he was once a training officer at Ayala Life Insurance, Inc. in 1997.

Career
He started his broadcasting career at GMA Network in 2000 with other known news personalities like Rhea Santos.

He is best known for being a host of the GMA News and Public Affairs shows 100% Pinoy (2006–07) and Pinoy Abroad (2005–06), and a news anchor of QTV/Q's The Beat (formerly Sapulso) (2006–2011), News on Q (2005–2011) - all of which he was partnered with Rhea Santos (from 2005 to 2010) and Connie Sison (from 2010 to 2011), followed by the second tandem On Call: Serbisyong Totoo. Ngayon. (2011–2012);, aired by GMA News TV (now GTV).

In May 2015, Mayrina is set to anchor GMA Newsfeed, an interactive newscast which will be broadcast nightly at 9PM on GMA News Facebook page, but he left in 2019 due to focused on his host duties, he replaced by various news reporters.

He replaced Jiggy Manicad as the anchor for 24 Oras Weekend in August 2018.

Personal life
Mayrina is married to Karen Tiongson, a GMA News Researcher in 2005. They have two children.

Filmography

Awards
 29th PMPC Star Awards for Television
 28th PMPC Star Awards for Television
 27th PMPC Star Awards for Television
 26th PMPC Star Awards for Television
 25th PMPC Star Awards for Television
 24th PMPC Star Awards for Television
 23rd PMPC Star Awards for Television
 22nd PMPC Star Awards for Television
 21st PMPC Star Awards for Television
 20th PMPC Star Awards for Television

References

External links
 Ivan Mayrina on GMA News Online

1976 births
Living people
Filipino television news anchors
GMA Network personalities
GMA Integrated News and Public Affairs people
People from Angeles City
University of the Philippines Diliman alumni